2007 Catalunya GP2 Series round was a GP2 Series motor race held on 12 May and 13 May 2007 at the Circuit de Catalunya in Montmeló, Catalonia, Spain. It was the second race of the 2007 GP2 Series season. The race was used to support the 2007 Spanish Grand Prix.

Classification

Qualifying

Feature race

Sprint race

References

Catalunya
Catalunya Gp2 Round, 2007